Stay in the Shade EP is an EP by José González, released 23 June 2004 in Sweden; 22 August 2005 in the United Kingdom and 24 January 2006 in the United States.

Track listing

CD
 "Stay in the Shade" – 2:45
 "Down the Hillside" – 2:19
 "Sensing Owls" – 3:12
 "Hand on Your Heart (Kylie Minogue Cover)" – 3:49
 "Instr." – 6:13

Limited edition 7" single
 Limited to 220 copies pressed
 "Down the Hillside" – 2:19
 "Sensing Owls" – 3:12

2005 EPs
José González (singer) EPs